Centric heterochromatin, a variety of heterochromatin, is a tightly packed form of DNA. Centric heterochromatin is a constituent in the formation of active centromeres in most higher-order organisms; the domain exists on both mitotic and interphase chromosomes.

Centric heterochromatin is usually formed on alpha satellite DNA in humans; however, there have been cases where centric heterochromatin and centromeres have formed on originally euchromatin domains lacking alpha satellite DNA; this usually happens as a result of a chromosome breakage event and the formed centromere is called a neocentromere.

Centric heterochromatin domains are flanked by pericentric heterochromatin.

See also
 Heterochromatin

References

DNA